Breasta is a commune in Dolj County, Oltenia, Romania with a population of  3,906  people. It is composed of seven villages: Breasta, Cotu, Crovna, Făget, Obedin, Roșieni and Valea Lungului.

References

Communes in Dolj County
Localities in Oltenia